Christoph M. Ohrt (born 30 March 1960, in Hamburg) is a German film and television actor. One of his best known roles was the portrayal of Felix Edel on the German television series Edel & Starck

Life
Ohrt grew up in Hamburg and attended the Gymnasium Eppendorf, a high school, which he left a few years before his graduation to study at a drama school. He later continued his drama studies at the Center for the Acting Process in the U.S.
The film  (1983) marks his start in cinema activity in Germany. In 2002 he started to portray Felix Edel on the TV series Edel & Starck receiving the Deutscher Fernsehpreis in the same year.

Personal life
He met his wife Stevee in Sherman Oaks a district of Los Angeles. They have two children daughter Lilly and son Spencer.

Filmography

Film

Television

References

External links

1960 births
Male actors from Hamburg
German male film actors
German male television actors
20th-century German male actors
21st-century German male actors
Living people